Duke Wen of Qi (died 804 BC) was from 815 to 804 BC the tenth recorded ruler of the State of Qi during the Western Zhou Dynasty of ancient China.  His personal name was Lü Chi (呂赤), ancestral name Jiang (姜), and Duke Wen was his posthumous title.

Duke Wen's father Duke Li of Qi was a despotic ruler, and in 816 BC the people of Qi rebelled and tried to make the son of Duke Hu of Qi, Duke Li's grand-uncle, the new ruler. Duke Li was killed by the rebels, but Duke Hu's son also died in the fighting. Subsequently, Duke Wen ascended the throne, and executed 70 people who were responsible for his father's death.

Duke Wen reigned for 12 years and died in 804 BC.  He was succeeded by his son, Duke Cheng of Qi.

Family
Sons:
 Prince Tuo (d. 795 BC), ruled as Duke Cheng of Qi from 803–795 BC
 Prince Gao, the grandfather of Gao Xi, who was the progenitor of the Gao lineage

Daughters:
 Qi Jiang
 Married Marquis Mu of Jin (d. 785 BC) in 808 BC, and had issue (Marquis Wen of Jin, Huan Shu of Quwo)

Ancestry

References

Monarchs of Qi (state)
9th-century BC Chinese monarchs
804 BC deaths
Year of birth unknown